La mia signora (internationally released as My Wife) is a 1964 Italian comedy film directed by  Tinto Brass, Mauro Bolognini and Luigi Comencini.

It consists of five episodes, all starring Alberto Sordi and Silvana Mangano.

The episode Eritrea, directed by Comencini, was later remade by Sergio Corbucci as the film Rimini Rimini (1987).

References

External links

1964 films
Commedia all'italiana
Films directed by Mauro Bolognini
Films directed by Tinto Brass
Films directed by Luigi Comencini
Italian comedy films
Films set in Rome
1964 comedy films
1960s Italian-language films
1960s Italian films